Karen Smith (born 16 May 1976) is a British diver. She competed in the women's 3 metre springboard event at the 2000 Summer Olympics.

References

External links
 

1976 births
Living people
British female divers
Olympic divers of Great Britain
Divers at the 2000 Summer Olympics
Place of birth missing (living people)